Bakwena Kgosidintsi Kgari (29 October 1921 – 16 May 1977) was a former politician and diplomat in Botswana. Kgari served as the third foreign minister of Botswana from 1971 to 1974.

References

1921 births
1977 deaths
Botswana diplomats
Foreign Ministers of Botswana
Government ministers of Botswana